Dolichyl-P-Man:Man(7)GlcNAc(2)-PP-dolichyl-alpha-1,6-mannosyltransferase is an enzyme that in humans is encoded by the ALG12 gene.

This gene encodes a member of the glycosyltransferase 22 family. The encoded protein catalyzes the addition of the eighth mannose residue in an alpha-1,6 linkage onto the dolichol-PP-oligosaccharide precursor (dolichol-PP-Man(7)GlcNAc(2)) required for protein glycosylation. Mutations in this gene have been associated with congenital disorder of glycosylation type Ig (CDG-Ig) characterized by abnormal N-glycosylation.

References

Further reading

External links
  GeneReviews/NCBI/NIH/UW entry on Congenital Disorders of Glycosylation Overview